Between 9 March and 5 April 1942 during World War II, forces of the Empire of Japan occupied the islands of Buka and Bougainville in the South Pacific. At that time these islands were part of the Australian-administered Territory of New Guinea. A platoon of Australian commandos from the 1st Independent Company was located at Buka Airfield when the Japanese landed but did not contest the invasion.

The Japanese invaded in order to construct naval and air bases to provide security for their major base at Rabaul, New Britain and to support strategic operations in the Solomon Islands. After the occupation of Buka and Bougainville, the Japanese began constructing a number of airfields across the island. The main airfields were on Buka Island, on the nearby Bonis Peninsula and at Kahili and Kieta, while naval bases were also constructed at Buin in the south and on the nearby Shortland Islands. These bases allowed the Japanese to conduct operations in the southern Solomon Islands and to attack the Allied lines of communication between the US and the Southwest Pacific Area.

In November 1943, allied forces landed on the west coast of Bougainville as part of the latter stages of Operation Cartwheel, and began building air bases to assist in the isolation and neutralization of Rabaul. U.S. Marines landed at Cape Torokina and established a beachhead within which the Allies eventually constructed three airfields. The invasion force was later replaced by U.S. Army soldiers in January 1944, and these were replaced by Australian Militia troops in October 1944. The campaign ended with the surrender of Japanese forces in August 1945.

Notes

References

Battles and operations of World War II involving Papua New Guinea
Conflicts in 1942
1942 in Papua New Guinea
South West Pacific theatre of World War II
Territory of New Guinea
Autonomous Region of Bougainville
Buka, Papua New Guinea
March 1942 events
April 1942 events
Battles of World War II involving Australia
Battles of World War II involving Japan
Battles of World War II involving the United States
Military history of Australia during World War II